Saluan, or Loinang after one of its dialects, is the main language of the eastern peninsula of the island of Sulawesi.

References

Saluan–Banggai languages
Languages of Sulawesi